Chatkal is a district of Jalal-Abad Region in western Kyrgyzstan. The administrative seat lies at Kanysh-Kyya.

Geography
The district  occupies high-altitude Chatkal valley limited by Talas Ala-Too from north, Pskem Range from north-west and west, and Chatkal Range from south-east. In addition, the district includes a small area of south-east slope of the Chatkal Range facing Fergana Valley. Elevations of the terrain range from approximately 1500 m at Sumsar to 4503 m in the Chatkal range. Some other picks of the district reach altitudes of over 4000 meters. Chatkal valley is pear-shaped. The slope of Chatkal Range facing the valley is terraced. The terraces are dissected by deep canyons of Chatkal river's tributaries, characterized by snowfields and small glaciers in the upstreams. Chandalash Range extends in the central part of the district. Mountains occupy 96%,  and vallies - 4% of the district. 

The hydrology is dominated by Chatkal river with multiple tributaries: the largest ones are Chandalash (right) and Ters (left).

Population

Rural communities and villages
In total, Chatkal District includes 21 settlements in 4 rural communities. Each rural community can consist of one or several villages. The rural communities and settlements in the Chatkal District are:

 Chatkal (seat: Jangy-Bazar; incl. Ak-Tash, Besh-Aral, Kurulush and Chandalash)
 Kanysh-Kyya (seat: Kanysh-Kyya; incl. Aygyr-Jar, Bashky-Terek, Korgon-Say, Kyzyl-Tokoy, Chakmak-Suu, Jer-Kapchygay, Kayyng-Suu, Kara-Bulak and Kara-Suu)
 Sumsar (seat: Sumsar; incl. Monchok-Döbö and Shekaftar)
 Terek-Say (seat: Terek-Say; incl. Ak-Terek and Bolush)

References 

Districts of Jalal-Abad Region